In enzymology, a tRNA-queuosine beta-mannosyltransferase is an enzyme that catalyzes the chemical reaction

GDP-mannose + tRNAAsp-queuosine  GDP + tRNAAsp-O-5"-beta-D-mannosylqueuosine

Thus, the two substrates of this enzyme are GDP-mannose and tRNAAsp-queuosine, whereas its two products are GDP and tRNAAsp-O-5''-beta-D-mannosylqueuosine.

This enzyme belongs to the family of glycosyltransferases, specifically the hexosyltransferases.  The systematic name of this enzyme class is GDP-mannose:tRNAAsp-queuosine O-5"-beta-D-mannosyltransferase.

References

 

EC 2.4.1
Enzymes of unknown structure